The Cabinet of Þorsteinn Pálsson was the government of Iceland between 8 July 1987 and 28 September 1988. It was led by Prime Minister Þorsteinn Pálsson.

Cabinet

Inaugural cabinet: 8 July 1987 – 28 September 1988

See also
Government of Iceland
Cabinet of Iceland

References

Thorsteinn Palsson, Cabinet of
Thorsteinn Palsson, Cabinet of
Thorsteinn Palsson, Cabinet of
Cabinets established in 1987
Cabinets disestablished in 1988
Independence Party (Iceland)
Progressive Party (Iceland)